Province 1 (I), also called the Province of New England, is one of nine ecclesiastical provinces making up the Episcopal Church in the United States of America. It is composed of the seven dioceses of New England, includes both the largest diocese (in number of members) (Diocese of Massachusetts) and the oldest diocese (Diocese of Connecticut) in the Episcopal Church. The Rt. Rev. Stephen T. Lane of the Diocese of Maine serves as President and the Rev. Kit Wang of the Diocese of Massachusetts serves as Vice President.

Dioceses of Province I

Diocese of Connecticut
Diocese of Maine
Diocese of Massachusetts
Diocese of New Hampshire
Diocese of Rhode Island
Diocese of Vermont
Diocese of Western Massachusetts

References and external links 
ECUSA Province Directory
Province I website

Ecclesiastical provinces of the Episcopal Church in the United States of America
Religion in New England